Dollaghan are a variety of brown trout (Salmo trutta) native to Lough Neagh, Northern Ireland, and many of its tributaries. They are a potamodromous migratory trout spending much of the year in the lough, returning to the rivers in autumn to spawn. Dollaghan are much sought after by anglers in County Antrim, County Tyrone and County Londonderry due to their greater size in comparison to the non-migratory trout found in streams such as the  Ballinderry River Six Mile Water, Moyola River and River Main. They are often caught in the dark using  methods very similar to that of fishing for sea trout. Many anglers regard them as an elusive species and call them 'sea trout of lough neagh'. Their weight varies greatly - from small fish of around 1/2 lb to large specimens of around 20 lb. There are four strains of brown trout in Ireland: Dollaghan, Gillaroo, Sonaghan and Ferox. The Dollaghan is thought to have evolved from sea trout which were land locked many years ago.

See also 

 Gillaroo
 Sonaghan
 Ferox trout

References 

 BBC Nature
 Angling in Northern Ireland
Fly Fishing Dollaghan Trout

Fish of Europe
Salmo